Hapoel Karmiel is an Israeli football club which represents the city of Karmiel . The club currently plays in Liga Gimel's North division.

The club has good reputation of being the most Fair Play club in Liga Alef for five consecutive seasons, and as a result, won the right to represent Israel in the UEFA Regions' Cup for the third consecutive time.

History
F.C. Karmiel Safed was formed in 2009 by a merger of Beitar Safed, which played in Liga Alef North division and Hapoel Karmiel, which played in Liga Bet North A division.

The best result of the club to date, was third-place finish in Liga Alef North at the 2013–14 season and qualification to the promotion play-offs, where they lost 0–2 in the first round to Hapoel Migdal HaEmek.

The club participated three times in the UEFA Regions' Cup. In the 2011 edition, they have reached the Intermediary round.

Honours

League

1Achieved by Beitar Safed

External links
Hapoel F.C. Karmiel Safed  Israel Football Association

References

Football clubs in Israel
Hapoel football clubs
Association football clubs established in 1960
Association football clubs disestablished in 2008
Association football clubs established in 2019
1960 establishments in Israel
2008 disestablishments in Israel
2019 establishments in Israel